Vincenza is an Italian female given name. Notable people with the name include:

Vincenza Armani, Italian actress
Vincenza Bono Parrino, Italian politician
Vincenza Calì, Italian track and field athlete
Vincenza Carrieri-Russo, American model
Vincenza Gerosa, Italian saint
Vincenza Garelli della Morea, Italian pianist
Vincenza Petrilli (born 1990), Italian paralympic archer
Vincenza Sicari, Italian runner
Sister Vincenza Taffarel, Italian nun
Vincenza Matilde Testaferrata, Maltese baroness
Vincenza Viganò-Mombelli, Italian ballerina

See also
Enza (given name)

Italian feminine given names